Asiab-e Tanureh (also Romanized as Āsīāb-e Tanūreh; also known as Āsīāb-e Mūsá) is a village in Bivanij Rural District, in the Central District of Dalahu County, Kermanshah Province, Iran. At the 2006 census, its population was 97, in 21 families.

References 

Populated places in Dalahu County